

People
Succi is an Italian surname. Notable people with the surname include:

Belén Succi (born 1985), Argentine field hockey player
Davide Succi (born 1981), Italian footballer
Sauro Succi, Italian physicist

Ancient history
 Succi was the name in antiquity for the Gate of Trajan, a mountain pass in Bulgaria

See also
13689 Succi, a main-belt asteroid

Italian-language surnames